Lukas is a German television series.

See also
List of German television series

References

External links
 

German comedy television series
1996 German television series debuts
2001 German television series endings
German-language television shows
ZDF original programming